Ben Yehuda Street is a street in Tel Aviv, Israel. The street runs from an intersection with Allenby Street, northwards intersecting where it runs roughly with the sea front to the west and Dizengoff Street to the east. At the northernmost end, it joins with Dizegoff Street, near Yarkon Park. The street is named after the founder of Modern Hebrew, the Litvak lexicographer and newspaper editor Eliezer Ben-Yehuda.

References

Streets in Tel Aviv
Shopping districts and streets in Israel